Xinxing is a county-level city and a sub-prefectural-level city in the People's Republic of China's Xinjiang Uyghur Autonomous Region. The county-level city implemented "division and city integration" with the 13rd Division of the Xinjiang Production and Construction Corps.  It is actually located with enclaves in Hami, and was established on February 4, 2021.

History 
In September 2018, the research team of the Civil Affairs Bureau of the Xinjiang Production and Construction Corps went to the 13rd Division of the Xinjiang Production and Construction Corps to investigate the proposed Xinxing. In December 2020, a report meeting on the overall planning results of the proposed Xinxing will be held. At the meeting, experts from the Henan Provincial Urban and Rural Planning and Design Institute Co., Ltd. will report on the overall urban design and regulatory detailed planning results of the overall planning of Xinxing.

On February 4, 2021, the People's Government of the Xinjiang Uygur Autonomous Region announced that with the approval of the State Council, the establishment of Xinxing City was approved, No. 57, Lanxin East Road, Huangtian Farm, 13th Division, Xinxing Municipal People's Government. Xinxing consists of the original Huangtian Farm, Red Star No. 1, Red Star No. 4, Red Star No. 2 Ranch, and Hongshan Gardening No. 2, The total area is 539.76 square kilometers. The scope of the central city: East to Bingdi Integration Avenue, west to Xihuan Road, south to South Damo Road, north to China National Highway 312 The planned area is 32 square kilometers.

Administrative division 
Xinxing City has jurisdiction over the core area, Red Star No. 1, Red Star No. 4, and Huangtian Farm.

References 

2021 establishments in China
County-level divisions of Xinjiang
Populated places in Xinjiang
Xinjiang Production and Construction Corps
States and territories established in 2021